Orahovica may refer to:

Bosnia and Herzegovina
Orahovica (Hadžići)
Orahovica (Konjic)
Orahovica (Lukavac)
Orahovica (Srebrenica)
Orahovica, Zenica
Orahovica, Žepče

Croatia
Orahovica
Orahovica Monastery

Montenegro 
 Orahovica, Montenegro